Tolstukha is a rural locality (a village) in Chushevitskoye Rural Settlement, Verkhovazhsky District, Vologda Oblast, Russia. The population was 3 as of 2002.

Geography 
Tolstukha is located 51 km southwest of Verkhovazhye (the district's administrative centre) by road. Vladykina Gora is the nearest rural locality.

References 

Rural localities in Verkhovazhsky District